Angela Michelle Harmon (born August 10, 1972) is an American actress and model. She won Seventeen's modeling contest in 1987 at age 15, signed with IMG Models, and appeared on covers for magazines such as Cosmopolitan and Esquire. Her acting breakthrough came with the role of Ryan McBride on Baywatch Nights (1995–1997), and she earned four Screen Actors Guild Award nominations for playing Abbie Carmichael on Law & Order (1998–2001). Harmon also appeared in a number of film roles, which notably include Barbara Gordon in Batman Beyond: Return of the Joker (2000) and Ronica Miles in Agent Cody Banks (2003).

Following the roles of Rose in the acclaimed-film Seraphim Falls (2006) and Lindsay Boxer in the short-lived series Women's Murder Club (2007–2008), Harmon earned praise for playing Jane Rizzoli on the TNT series Rizzoli & Isles (2010–2016), and won the Gracie Award for Outstanding Female Actor in a Leading Role in a Drama Series or Special in 2012 and the People's Choice Award for Favorite Cable TV Actress in 2015. She has starred in a number of Lifetime network's original projects, which include the biographical special Video Voyeur (2002) and the critically-acclaimed feature Living Proof (2008). In 2021, she signed an exclusive multi-picture deal with Lifetime.

Early life
She was born in the Dallas suburb of Highland Park, Texas, the daughter of Daphne Demar (née Caravageli) and Lawrence Paul "Larry" Harmon, a hospital information network executive in Dallas, Texas. Her father has German and Irish ancestry, while her mother is of Greek descent. In an episode of Who Do You Think You Are?, Harmon found that she had a German ancestor who served in George Washington's army during the American Revolutionary War, and that ancestor later acquired land in Mercer County, Kentucky. The land is still owned by a distant branch of her family.

Career 
Harmon worked as a child model, and in 1987 won a Seventeen modeling contest. She attended Highland Park High School until 1990, where she was a member of the Highland Belles. She won a Spectrum Model Search contest shortly afterward, subsequently pursued a successful modeling career, and became well known in the early 1990s. She worked as a runway model for Calvin Klein, Giorgio Armani, and Donna Karan and appeared on the covers of ELLE, Cosmopolitan, and Esquire. She is signed with IMG Models in New York City.

Harmon began acting in 1995 after being discovered on a plane by David Hasselhoff. She then had a leading role in Baywatch Nights and the short-lived C-16: FBI. She also appeared in the 1998 film, Lawn Dogs, which received only a limited theatrical release.

In the late 1990s, Harmon became better known when she joined the NBC series Law & Order, playing ADA Abbie Carmichael from 1998 to 2001. During this time, she also voiced Barbara Gordon in the animated film Batman Beyond: Return of the Joker, succeeding Stockard Channing in that role. Harmon left Law & Order to concentrate on her film career, saying that she preferred working in film to television.

After appearing in the 2001 direct-to-video film Good Advice, she had a supporting role in Agent Cody Banks (2003), playing the CIA handler of a teenage agent (Frankie Muniz). In 2006, Harmon co-starred with Cuba Gooding Jr. and James Woods in the direct-to-DVD political suspense drama End Game, and appeared as Rose in the acclaimed Western film Seraphim Falls.

In 2006, Harmon starred in an ABC pilot Secrets of a Small Town, which did not go to series. She also starred in another failed television show on NBC, Inconceivable, which was canceled after two episodes. The following year, she starred in another ABC pilot, Women's Murder Club, which aired for thirteen episodes. Harmon was one of five actresses who posed discreetly nude for the May 2008 issue of Allure magazine, alongside Gabrielle Union, Zoe McLellan, Jill Scott, and Ana Ortiz.

 In 2010, Harmon hosted an infomercial for "UpLiv", a stress-management program, and also appeared in an infomercial for Olay "Pro-X" wrinkle cream. From 2010 to 2016, she co-starred with Sasha Alexander in the TNT crime-drama series Rizzoli & Isles, playing Boston police detective Jane Rizzoli. The show premiered July 12, 2010. She directed the series' 100th episode. Harmon won Outstanding Female Actor in a Leading Role in a Drama Series for Rizzoli & Isles at the 2012 Gracie Allen Awards, and also won a People's Choice Award for Favorite Cable TV Actress in 2015.

Harmon appeared in the music video for Craig Morgan's "This Ole Boy", released in January 2012. In July 2012, during promotions for a new season of Rizzoli and Isles, Harmon revealed on Conan O'Brien's late night series that she was a fan of and very interested in playing a film version of She-Hulk should such a film become available.

In June 2021, Harmon had signed a multi-picture development deal with Lifetime where she hosted the documentary series Cellmate Secrets and starred as Hazel King in Buried in Barstow.

Personal life
On March 13, 2000, Harmon became engaged to former NFL player Jason Sehorn. She was appearing as a guest on The Tonight Show with Jay Leno when Leno called Sehorn out as a surprise guest. Sehorn immediately walked up to her, knelt down on one knee, and proposed. They were married on June 9, 2001. They have three daughters: Finley; Avery, and Emery. Both publicly support the Republican Party. In November 2014, Harmon and Sehorn announced their separation after 13 years of marriage.

On December 26, 2019, Harmon announced her engagement to soap-opera actor Greg Vaughan.

Filmography

Film

Television

Awards and nominations

References

External links

 
 
 

Living people
20th-century American actresses
21st-century American actresses
Actresses from Texas
American female models
American film actresses
American female taekwondo practitioners
American people of German descent
American people of Greek descent
American people of Irish descent
American stage actresses
American television actresses
Female models from Texas
People from Highland Park, Texas
1972 births